Peter Welsh (born 29 June 1951) is a former Australian rules footballer who played with Footscray in the VFL. 

Welsh usually played as a ruckman or in a key position. He won Footscray's Best and Fairest award in 1972 and kicked a career high 44 goals in 1974. He also represented Victoria at interstate football.

External links

1951 births
Living people
Australian rules footballers from Victoria (Australia)
Western Bulldogs players
Charles Sutton Medal winners